The Oaxaca mud turtle (Kinosternon oaxacae) is a species of mud turtle in the family Kinosternidae. It is endemic to Mexico. Both the common name and the scientific name derive from Oaxaca, a Mexican state. The International Union for Conservation of Nature has rated this species as "data deficient" as there is insufficient information available to judge its conservation status.

Description
The carapace has three distinctive longitudinal keels and is slightly depressed, the width being about 60% of the length and 35% of the height. The colour of the carapace is dark brown or blackish, or a mottling of the two, and in pale-coloured individuals, the seams are darker. The plastron is relatively narrow, being about two thirds the width of the carapace. It is concave in males and nearly flat in females, and is yellowish or pale brown with darker seams. There is a V-shaped or bell-shaped rostral shield. The head is dark brown or black mottled with cream; it is sometimes reticulated but is not striped. The underside of the head and throat are cream and there are three or four pairs of barbel on the chin and throat. The limbs are grey or brown above and cream below, while the tail is uniformly greyish brown.

Distribution and habitat
Its habitat is marshes, muddy pools and other still, turbid water bodies, and it occasionally occurs in rivers. It is sometimes found on the coastal plain, having apparently been washed down by rivers in spate.

Ecology
The diet probably consists mostly of plant material, but small animals such as tadpoles, shrimps, beetles and fish are also eaten. These turtles are most active in the rainy season which lasts from June to October. Breeding probably takes place in July with the eggs hatching after the rains cease. The young are slow-growing and it takes from between seven and ten years for them to reach maturity.

References

Kinosternon
Turtles of North America
Endemic reptiles of Mexico
Natural history of Oaxaca
Reptiles described in 1980
Taxonomy articles created by Polbot